Actinocyclus verrucosus is a species of sea slug or dorid nudibranch, a marine gastropod mollusk in the family Actinocyclidae.

Distribution 
This species was described from Massawa, Eritrea, Red Sea. It is widespread in the tropical Indo-Pacific Ocean.

References

Chromodorididae
Gastropods described in 1831
Taxa named by Christian Gottfried Ehrenberg